Jackson Township is a township in Grundy County, in the U.S. state of Missouri.

Jackson Township has the name of Andrew Jackson, 7th President of the United States.

References

Townships in Missouri
Townships in Grundy County, Missouri